Miriam Shomer Zunser (November 25, 1882 – October 11, 1951) was an American journalist, playwright and artist.  She was a significant promoter of Jewish culture prior to World War II.

Life 
Zunser was born Manya Shaikevitsch in Odessa, Russian Empire, to Nokhem Mayer Shaikevitsch, a novelist and playwright, and his wife Dinneh Bercinsky. Her family emigrated in 1889 to New York. After graduating high school she worked as a librarian while attending art classes taught by Henry McBride at the Educational Alliance.

In 1932 Zunser was a co-founder and initial president of MAILAMM, the America-Palestine Institute of Musical Sciences (known by its Hebrew acronym), a society for the study and promotion of Jewish music in Palestine and the United States. Later, she was treasurer of the Jewish Music Forum.

Having worked with Henrietta Szold, she was the founder of the Brooklyn chapter of Hadassah Women's Zionist Organization of America.

Zunser died in New York City.

Personal 
In 1905 she married Charles Zunser, son of the poet Eliakum Zunser. They had three children. Her sister was the Yiddish folksinger Anna Shomer Rothenberg.

Publications 
 Fortune's fool; a musical comedy in two acts and four scenes. New York: 192?
 A child's kingdom. New York: 192?
 Goldenlocks and the bears. New York: 192?
 Yesterday : a memoir of a Russian Jewish family. Published in 1939 by Stackpole Sons. Republished in 1978 by Harper & Row.
 Avinu Shomer (אבינו שמ״ר). Yerushalayim: Aḥiʼasaf, 1953.

References

External links 
 Miriam Shomer Zunser Papers at the New York Public Library

1882 births
1951 deaths
Odesa Jews
American women dramatists and playwrights
Jewish American journalists
Emigrants from the Russian Empire to the United States
20th-century American women artists
Artists from New York City
Jewish American dramatists and playwrights
American women journalists
20th-century American journalists
20th-century American dramatists and playwrights
20th-century American women writers
Jewish women writers
Hadassah Women's Zionist Organization of America members
Jewish women artists
Jewish American artists
Jewish musicologists